The Monocle Laughs or The Monocle (French: Le monocle rit jaune, Italian:L'ispettore spara a vista) is a 1964 French-Italian comedy thriller film directed by Georges Lautner and starring Paul Meurisse, Marcel Dalio and Olivier Despax. It is the third in a trilogy of films directed by Lautner and starring Meurisse. It is preceded by The Black Monocle (1961) and The Eye of the Monocle (1962).

Cast
 Paul Meurisse as Le commandant Théobald Dromard dit'Le Monocle' 
 Marcel Dalio as Elie Mayerfitsky  
 Olivier Despax as Frédéric  
 Edward Meeks as Major Sidney  
 Henri Nassiet as The Colonel  
 Pierre Richard as Bergourian  
 Michel Duplaix as The Colonel's Assistant  
 Renée Saint-Cyr as Madame Hui  
 Holley Wong as Inspector Hui 
 Cheng-Liang Kwan as Li  
 Lily Hong-Kong as Cora  
 Robert Dalban as Poussin  
 Barbara Steele as Valérie 
 Marcel Bernier as The Colonel's Man  
 Guy Henry 
 Raymond Meunier as The Interviewer  
 Lino Ventura as Elie's Client

References

Bibliography 
 Rège, Philippe. Encyclopedia of French Film Directors, Volume 1. Scarecrow Press, 2009.

External links 
 

1964 films
Italian comedy thriller films
French comedy thriller films
1960s comedy thriller films
1960s French-language films
Films directed by Georges Lautner
1964 comedy films
1960s French films
1960s Italian films